Ras al-Far'a is a Palestinian town in the Tubas Governorate in the Northern area of the West Bank, located 5 kilometers South west of Tubas. According to the Palestinian Central Bureau of Statistics, the town had a population of over 701 inhabitants in mid-year 2006. The healthcare facilities for Ras al-Far'a are based in Tammun and the nearby refugee camp of al-Far'a.

See also
 Far'a refugee camp
 Wadi al-Far'a village
 Wadi al-Far'a (river)

References

External links
Ras al-Far'a Village Profile. Applied Research Institute - Jerusalem. February, 2006
Ras al Far'a (Fact Sheet), The Applied Research Institute - Jerusalem. February, 2006

Tubas Governorate
Villages in the West Bank
Municipalities of the State of Palestine